Keld  may refer to:
Keld, Cumbria, England
Keld, North Yorkshire, England
Variation of Kjell (name), a Danish given name
 KELD (AM), a radio station (1400 AM) licensed to El Dorado, Arkansas, United States
 KELD-FM, a radio station (106.5 FM) licensed to Hampton, Arkansas, United States
 the ICAO code for South Arkansas Regional Airport at Goodwin Field